Saint Paisius of Hilendar or Paìsiy Hilendàrski (1722–1773) was a Bulgarian clergyman and a key Bulgarian National Revival figure. He is most famous for being the author of Istoriya Slavyanobolgarskaya (1762), the first significant modern Bulgarian history that became famous and has been copied and distributed everywhere in the Bulgarian lands. The book is overall third modern Bulgarian history after the works titled "History of Bulgaria" by Petar Bogdan Bakshev in 1667 and by Blasius Kleiner in 1761. He is considered the forefather of the Bulgarian National Revival.

Paisius was born in the Samokov eparchy of the time. There is a scientific dispute about the exact place of his birth, although the prevailing consensus points to the town of Bansko. He established himself in the Serbian Orthodox Hilandar monastery on Mount Athos in 1745, where he was later a hieromonk and deputy-abbot. In the 17th century the number of Serbian monks here dwindled, and during 18th century it was headed by Bulgarian monks, even though some presence of Serbian monks was also noted.  Collecting materials for two years through hard work and even visiting the Habsburg monarchy, he finished his Istoriya Slavyanobolgarskaya in 1762 in the Zograf Monastery. The book was the first attempt to write a complete history of Bulgaria and attempted to awaken and strengthen Bulgarian national consciousnesses. 
The most famous part of the whole book is the paragraph:"Oh, you unwise moron! Why are you ashamed to call yourself a Bulgarian and why don't you read and speak in your native language? Weren't Bulgarians powerful and glorious once? Didn't they take taxes from strong Romans and wise Greeks? Out of all the Slavic nations they were the bravest one. Our rulers were the first ones to call themselves kings, the first ones to have patriarchs, the first ones to baptise their people.(...) Why are you ashamed of your great history and your great language and why do you leave it to turn yourselves into Greeks? Why do you think they are any better than you? Well, here you're right because did you see a Greek leave his country and ancestry like you do?" 
This more or less signifies the purpose of the author who speaks about the danger of Bulgarians falling victim to the Hellenization policies of the mainly Greek clergy. These anti-Greek sentiments presented in Paisius  writing, characterized the Greeks as some kind of Bulgarian national enemies. The book's first manual copy was done by Sophronius of Vratsa in 1765. Structurally, Istoriya Slavyanobolgarskaya consists of two introductions, several chapters that discuss various historic events, a chapter about the "Slavic teachers", the disciples of Cyril and Methodius, a chapter about the Bulgarian saints, and an epilogue. As Paisius toured Bulgaria as a mendicant friar, he brought his work, which was copied and spread among the Bulgarians. He is thought to have died on the way to Mount Athos near Ampelino (modern-day Asenovgrad).

Honour
Paisiy Peak on Livingston Island in the South Shetland Islands, Antarctica is named after Paisiy of Hilendar.

The saint is portrayed on the obverse of the Bulgarian 2 lev banknote, issued in 1999 and 2005.

References and notes

1722 births
1773 deaths
Bulgarian saints
18th-century Christian saints
Macedonia under the Ottoman Empire
18th-century Bulgarian historians
Macedonian Bulgarians
Istoriya Slavyanobolgarskaya
People associated with Hilandar Monastery